The 1940 United States Senate election in Missouri was held on November 5, 1940. Incumbent Democratic U.S. Senator and future President of the United States Harry S. Truman, who was first elected in 1934, decided to seek re-election to a second term. He narrowly survived a primary challenge from Governor of Missouri Lloyd C. Stark before also narrowly defeating Republican nominee Manvel H. Davis in the general election.

Democratic primary

Candidates
Maurice M. Milligan, U.S. Attorney for the Western District of Missouri
Lloyd C. Stark, Governor of Missouri since 1937
Harry S. Truman, incumbent U.S. Senator since 1935

Campaign
Heading into the election of 1940, the Pendergast machine that had propelled Harry S. Truman to victory in the 1934 election had been brought to its knees. Tom Pendergast was ill and imprisoned for widespread voter fraud in the 1936 elections, in which more votes were tallied in Kansas City than its entire population. As such, Truman's connections to Pendergast going back to his 1922 candidacy for judge in Jackson County were a liability in the campaign. Missouri Governor Lloyd C. Stark, who had portrayed himself as an opponent of the machine, challenged Truman for the Democratic nomination for U.S. Senator.

Truman, who had decided to seek a second term in February 1940, overcame his Pendergast connections and defeated Stark for the Democratic nomination.

Results

Republican primary

Candidates
William Byers
Manvel H. Davis, former State Senator from Kansas City
Herman G. Grosby
Harold Milligan
Ewing Young Mitchell
Paul O. Peters
David M. Proctor, perennial candidate

Results

General election

Campaign
Touting his experience as a World War I veteran and track record as a U.S. Senator, Truman ultimately defeated Republican candidate and former state senator Manvel H. Davis in the November general election.

Results

See also
1940 United States Senate elections
List of United States senators from Missouri

References

1940
Missouri
United States Senate
Harry S. Truman